Atanas Zhelev (born 31 January 1938) is a Bulgarian rower. He competed in the men's double sculls event at the 1968 Summer Olympics.

References

External links
 

1938 births
Living people
Bulgarian male rowers
Olympic rowers of Bulgaria
Rowers at the 1968 Summer Olympics
People from Sozopol